Constantin Diaconovici Loga National College may refer to one of two educational institutions in Romania:

Constantin Diaconovici Loga National College (Caransebeș)
Constantin Diaconovici Loga National College (Timișoara)